Sunbiggin is a hamlet in the Eden district, in the English county of Cumbria.

Location 
It is near the villages of Raisbeck and Orton.

Transport 
For transport there is the M6 motorway, A685 road, B6260 road and B6261 road nearby. It has a tarn called Sunbiggin Tarn.

References 

 http://www.visitcumbria.com/pen/sunbiggintarn.htm
 http://www.british-towns.net/sc/level_4_display_local_websites.asp?GetL3=16609

Hamlets in Cumbria
Orton, Eden